Birgit Wiese (born 10 November 1965) is a German footballer. She played in five matches for the Germany women's national football team from 1988 to 1991.

References

External links
 

1965 births
Living people
German women's footballers
Germany women's international footballers
Place of birth missing (living people)
Women's association footballers not categorized by position